Dance FM  is a clubbing radio station from Romania, which is owned by RCS & RDS. It broadcasts on 89.5 FM in Bucharest and on the internet. It was officially released on 21 February 2011 at an event organised by The Mission.

On 18 June 2011, Dance FM organised an event, where Tiesto mixed music for more than 3,000 people at the Arenele Romane (ro) in Bucharest.

Frequencies

Schedule

Notes

External links

Dance FM live

Radio stations in Romania